The Nokia Asha 210 is a dual-band QWERTY messenger phone powered by the Series 40 operating system. It was officially announced on April 24, 2013, and it is part of the Nokia Asha series of feature phones. There are both single SIM and dual SIM versions available. It retailed for $72 upon release. Depending by market and mode, the Asha 210 has a dedicated button for either the WhatsApp application, Facebook, or the web browser.

Models sold in Singapore, Indonesia and Malaysia support three languages: English, Indonesian and Simplified Mandarin.

References 

Asha 210
Mobile phones with user-replaceable battery
Mobile phones introduced in 2013